Coromoro is a town and municipality in the Santander Department in northeastern Colombia.

References 

Municipalities of Santander Department